The 1996 Pro Bowl was the NFL's all-star game for the 1995 season. The game was played on February 4, 1996, at Aloha Stadium in Honolulu, Hawaii. The final score was NFC 20, AFC 13. Jerry Rice of the San Francisco 49ers was named the game's Most Valuable Player after he had two clutch catches, including the final one which won the game. He finished with six catches for 82 yards.

The attendance for the game was 50,034. The coaches were Mike Holmgren of the Green Bay Packers and Ted Marchibroda of the Indianapolis Colts. The referee was Tom White.

AFC roster

Offense

Defense

Special teams

NFC roster

Offense

Defense

Special teams

References

Pro Bowl
Pro Bowl
Pro Bowl
Pro Bowl
Pro Bowl
American football competitions in Honolulu
February 1996 sports events in the United States